ξ Mensae, Latinized as Xi Mensae, is a single star in the southern circumpolar constellation of Mensa. It has a yellow-orange hue and is just barely visible to the naked eye as a dim point of light with an apparent visual magnitude of 5.84. This object is located about 366 light years away from the Sun based on parallax, but is drifting closer with a radial velocity of −5 km/s.

This object is an aging giant star with a stellar classification of G8/K0III. It is 281 million years old with 1.91 times the mass of the Sun. The star displays micro-variability, fluctuating in brightness by 0.0049 magnitudes with a period of 148 days. With the supply of hydrogen at its core exhausted, the star has cooled and expanded to nine times the Sun's radius. It is radiating 50 times the luminosity of the Sun from its swollen photosphere at an effective temperature of 5,131 K.

References

G-type giants
K-type giants
Mensa (constellation)
Mensae, Xi
034172
023148
1716
Durchmusterung objects